The Ministry for Rural Affairs, also known as the Ministry of Agriculture, was a ministry within the government of Sweden. The Ministry was dissolved in 2015, when rural affairs was transferred to the Ministry of Enterprise. 

Areas of responsibility have included agriculture and environmental issues relating to agriculture, fishery, reindeer husbandry, Sami affairs, horticulture, animal welfare, foodstuffs, hunting and game management, as well as higher education and research in the field of agricultural sciences.

History 
The ministry was formed in 1900 as the first new ministry after the departemental reform of 1840. Originally named Ministry of Agriculture, it changed its name to the Ministry for Rural Affairs on January 1, 2011. The last Head of the Ministry was the Minister for Rural Affairs, Social Democratic MP Sven-Erik Bucht.

Government agencies 
At the time of its closure, the Ministry was principal for the following government agencies:

References

Rural Affairs